Let or LET may refer to:

Sports
 Let serve, when the served object in certain racket sports hits the net and lands in the correct service court, such as;
 Let (badminton)
 Let (pickleball)
 Let (tennis) 
 Ladies European Tour, the ladies professional golf tour of Europe

Terminology
 -let as an English diminutive suffix

 Let expression, a name binding construct in computer programming languages
 Let statement, a statement used in word problems requiring algebraic equations
 Letting, a system of payment for the temporary use of something owned by someone else, also known as "rental"

People, titles, characters
 Licensed Engineering Technologist
 Let, a fictional character from the anime series Rave Master

Places, locations
 County Leitrim, Ireland, Chapman code LET
 Let, West Virginia
 Leț, a village in Boroșneu Mare Commune, Covasna County, Romania
 Alfredo Vásquez Cobo International Airport (IATA code LET), Leticia, Colombia
 Lei Tung station (station code LET) of the Hong Kong MTR

Groups, organizations, companies
 Lashkar-e-Taiba (LeT), a militant Pakistani Islamist organization
 Let Kunovice (LET), a Czechoslovak and Czech aircraft manufacturer
 LET, part of a font name indicating the font is owned by Letraset; for example, Academy Engraved LET

Other uses
 Linear energy transfer, a property of ionizing radiation's interactions with matter
 Lorentz ether theory, a scientific theory
 LET solution or gel, a topical anesthetic consisting of 4% lidocaine, 1:2,000 epinephrine, and 0.5% tetracaine
 Light Emitting Transistor, a future technology that could be used in Organic light-emitting transistor (OLET) screens

See also

 
 
 lets (disambiguation)
 IET (disambiguation)